Simon Proctor (born 1959) is a British composer and pianist, known for his works for unusual instruments.

Education
Proctor graduated from the Royal Academy of Music where he gained the GRSM degree, LRAM diploma in piano and several prizes for composition, orchestration and piano.

Career
His best-known work, the Concerto for Serpent and Orchestra, was written in 1987 when the composer was attached to the University of South Carolina. Its premiere, with the soloist Alan Lumsden and the University of South Carolina Chamber Orchestra under Donald Portnoy, was at the First International Serpent Festival on 21 October 1989. Douglas Yeo performed it again on 31 March 1997 at New England Conservatory, and then on 29 and 30 May 1997 with the Boston Pops Orchestra conducted by John Williams, both in Boston.

Other compositions include his Concerto for Keyed Bugle and Orchestra. The Amherst Suite also features the serpent. He composed a Jubilee Fanfare for the RHS Bicentennial, which was attended by the Duke of Edinburgh.

He has also composed a great number of other works, including 26 concertos, and many works for solo piano including a seven-part fugue.

He composed a symphony, which included a hand bell ensemble, for the Lincoln Park Academy Orchestra in 1998.

He composed a James Bond Piano Concerto.  This had its world premiere on 20 February 2010 in Cadogan Hall, London.  It was performed by the London Gay Symphony Orchestra.  Thomas Pandolfi was the solo pianist.

Proctor is a graduate of the Royal Academy of Music. He lives in Sevenoaks, Kent and teaches piano in several schools with Kent Music centre, and privately. He has performed solo piano recitals in the UK, Germany, USA and The Bahamas. Simon has played principal keyboard for Les Miserables and other shows, and has acted as musical director for other productions.

He has made two CDs of his compositions, Sounds of Kent – Piano (recorded by 12-year-old Tyler Hay), and Sounds of Kent – Woodwind (recorded by the Pneuma Quintet, a wind quintet of students from the Royal Academy of Music). A movement from his Concerto for Ophicleide and Orchestra has been recorded by Nick Byrne and David Miller. His Serpent Concerto was recorded by Douglas Yeo on the CD Le Monde du Serpent.

Works
Rhapsody No. 17 (piano)
Nocturne in Silver and Blue    (piano)
Paganini Metamorphosis    (piano)
Beauchamp Dances    (piano)
Windy City (piano)
Windy City   (symphonic concert band, dedicated to the College of Lake County Wind Ensemble)
Euphonious Nocturne  (piano)
Nocturne at Lake Maggiore  (piano)
Rhapsody No. 21 (piano)
The Three of Harps    (piano)
Apex 101    (piano)
The Jester    (flute, oboe, clarinet)
Eos    (alto saxophone, piano)
Vögel I–XII    (flute, piano)
Pnuemusic     (flute, oboe, clarinet, horn, bassoon)
Wippersnapper   (piccolo, piano)
Metamorphosis   (piano trio consisting of piano, violin, cello)
Hosedown   (quintet of garden hoses of different lengths, played with brass instrument mouthpieces, in the style of a western hoe-down, dedicated to the Antioch Brass Quintet)
Light Metal   (suite for euphonium & tuba quartet, dedicated to the Heavy Metal Society quartet; also a version titled "Lighter Metal" for saxophone quartet)
Amherst Suite   (serpent ensemble)
Miniatures at an Exhibition   (a quick walk through Moussorgsky's "Pictures and an Exhibition" for euphonium & tuba quartet; also a version for saxophone quartet)
Trombone Concerto No. 3
Tuba Concerto     (With obbligato tuba in orchestra, and double cadenza for both tubas in the first movement. Premiered in 1996, Sydney, Australia by Susan Bradley, tuba, with National Chamber Opera of Australia, conducted by Chris Howes)

References

External links
Simon Proctor's website
Warwick Music page on Simon Proctor, accessed 12 Dec 2013
Musicroom list of published music by Simon Proctor, accessed 21 December 2009
Serpent website newsletter mentioning Simon Proctor, accessed 21 December 2009

British composers
British classical pianists
Male classical pianists
British classical flautists
Living people
Place of birth missing (living people)
1959 births
Alumni of the Royal Academy of Music
21st-century classical pianists
21st-century British male musicians
21st-century flautists